Otari may refer to:

 Otari, Nagano, Japan
 Otari Incorporated, makers of reel-to-reel tape recorders; see ProDigi
 Otari School, Wellington, New Zealand
 Otari-Wilton's Bush, native botanic garden and forest reserve, Wilton, Wellington, New Zealand
 Muhammad Naji al-Otari, Prime Minister of Syria
 Otari Arshba, Russian politician
 Otari Kvantrishvili, Georgian mafia boss

See also
 Otar (disambiguation)
 Otaru